Russ Walker (born 1 September 1962) is a former professional rugby League footballer who played in the 1980s and 1990s, playing for Barrow and Hull F.C., as a , or .

Russ Walker was a tough tackler who combined his career with a job as a milkman, retired from rugby, he now works in the petrochemical industry in Barrow-in-Furness.

From 1994 to 1995 Walker was joint team coach of Hull F.C. with Phil Windley.

Russ Walker played , and scored a try in Hull FC's 14–4 victory over Widnes in the Premiership Final during the 1990–91 season at Old Trafford, Manchester on Sunday 12 May 1991.

References

External links
(archived by web.archive.org) Back on the Wembley trail

1962 births
Living people
Barrow Raiders players
Cumbria rugby league team players
Hull F.C. coaches
Hull F.C. players
Rugby articles needing expert attention
Rugby league coaches
Rugby league players
Rugby league props
Rugby league second-rows